Dr. Sampat Shivangi is an Indian born American Physician. Shivangi is the president of Indian American Forum for Political education. He has been serving the Board for the Department of Mental Health in Mississippi for several years. Shivangi is the past president-elect of the American Association of Physicians of Indian Origin. Shivangi has received several awards for his work. The most notable award he has received is the Pravasi Bharatiya Samman award from the President of India Pranab Mukherjee in Bengaluru on the Pravasi Bharatiya Divas.

Early life and background
Sampat Shivangi was born in the town of Athani in Karnataka State of India. He joined Kasturba Medical College in Manipal, India where he received his under Grad in medicine M.B.B.S. He later attended Karnataka Medical College in Hubli, India where he received his M.D and D.G.O post-graduate degrees in Medicine.

Biography
Sampat Shivangi completed his Doctor of Medicine (MD) in Ob-Gyn and migrated to the United States in 1976. Later, he completed a fellowship from Washington University School of Medicine, St. Louis, Missouri. Dr. Shivangi served as the Advisor to the US Secretary of Health and Human Services from 2005 to 2008. He is the founding president of the American Association of Physicians of Indian origin in Mississippi and is the past president and chair of the India Association of Mississippi.

He earlier served on the Mississippi State Board of Health. Shivangi has been honored for his role as adviser to the United States Department of Health and Human Services in the George W. Bush administration and chairmanship of Mississippi State Board of Mental Health.

Dr. Shivangi also served as a house delegate in American Medical Association Chicago, IL. He has worked on India Civil Nuclear treaty and US India defense treaty that was passed in US Congress and signed by US-President  George W. Bush.He attended numerous National GOP Conventions as a Delegate.

The state of Mississippi also honored Shivangi by naming a lane after him in one of the premier medical facilities at Boswell Regional Medical Center. He joined Executive Advisory Board of the Washington, DC-based think tank International Leaders Summit. He advocated for the Green card reforms in the United States for physicians, engineers, teachers, nurses, and medical professionals.

Awards and achievements
 2008: Ellis Island Medal of Honor New York, NY 2008
 2017: Person of the Year by the Indian American Republican Committee
 2017: Pravasi Bharatiya Diwas Sanman award

See also
 American Association of Physicians of Indian Origin
 Sanjiv Chopra
 Ami Bera
 Balamurali Ambati

References

External links

 Dr. Sampat Shivangi on Mississippi Department of Mental Health
 Sampat Shivangi on Manipal University

Living people
American physicians
Medical doctors from Karnataka
Indian emigrants to the United States
American physicians of Indian descent
American people of Indian descent in health professions
Year of birth missing (living people)